Lügenmarsch (German for "March of Lie") is an EP by German rock band Böhse Onkelz. It was released in 1989. Lügenmarsch contains seven tracks, five of which are also on the album Kneipenterroristen.

Track listing
"Ein guter Freund" (A Good Friend)
"Könige für einen" Tag (Kings for One Day)
"Lügenmarsch" (March of Lies)
"Freddy Krueger"
"Guten Tag" (Good Afternoon)
"Tanz der Teufel" (German name of the movie "The Evil Dead")
"Religion"

Track notes

Ein guter Freund
The songs contains the message that a good friend is the best that you can find on the earth. It is sung in the style of a typical drinking song, including an easy text and a rhythmic melody.

Könige für einen Tag
They dreamed about to be kings for one day. "Vermin, carrying me on their hands / and goes to soccer with me / Metallica is yard chapel / so should it be/
"Chorus:"We are kings for one day, kings for one day"

Lügenmarsch
This song is written for the press and for the Bundesprüfstelle, which banned the first album.
The song parodies common cliches about metallers, the press used to discredit the band.
For example, it contains a passage, that addresses the song to people who don't like the band due to their long hair. (Für die Leute die uns immer wieder schreiben, mit langen Haaren können wir euch nicht leiden)
In the refrain they are singing "we are total metallers" (Wir sind die totalen Metaller). The term metaller is pronounced in a very German way, that could be a site blow to their conservative opposers, who like to use traditional expressions.
The ironic use of "total" expresses that they don't want to be labeled as typical metallers, but as individual band.

Böhse Onkelz albums
1989 EPs
German-language albums